Oakwood Mall is a shopping mall in Enid, Oklahoma, United States. There are about 53,000 people that live within  and 178,000 within  of the mall. The property sits at just over 62 acres.

History
The Oakwood Mall opened on February 29, 1984. When the mall opened, it allowed for national tenants Dillard's  to open their first stores in the area, as well as JC Penney and Newman's moving from downtown to be the three anchor stores. On opening day, the mall had room for 85-95 tenants and a 12 restaurant food court. Within one year of opening, the mall's occupancy stood at about 70%, more than the 25% the mall had on opening day.

In June 2012, Victor Companies CEO Jim Dill announced plans to de-mall the property by eliminating indoor spaces as part of a $35 million deal. The city of Enid offered a $5 million tax incentive once the property had 85% of the spaces leased, which never did happen. By May 2014, the Victor Companies puled the plug on redevelopment, leaving the mall to explore other opportunities. In October 2014, Sears announced that it would close their location in the former Newman's by January 2015 along with the Auto Center. In the summer of 2019, Dillard's announced that they would be closing around or by the end of the year. In June 2020, JCPenney announced that it would close the store at Oakwood Mall, along with 153 other locations. This store would close in the fall, along with five other Oklahoma stores.

References 

Shopping malls established in 1984
Shopping malls in Oklahoma
1984 establishments in Oklahoma
Tourist attractions in Enid, Oklahoma
Buildings and structures in Garfield County, Oklahoma
Buildings and structures completed in 1984